Kalwaria may refer to any of the Polish towns named after Calvary (the site of Jesus's crucifixion):

Góra Kalwaria, sanctuary near Warsaw
Kalwaria Pacławska, sanctuary near Przemyśl
Kalwaria Zebrzydowska, sanctuary near Kraków
Kalwaria, Pomeranian Voivodeship

See also
Kalvarija (disambiguation)